Hermann Graf (24 October 1912 – 4 November 1988) was a German Luftwaffe World War II fighter ace. He served on both the Eastern and Western Fronts. He became the first pilot in aviation history to claim 200 aerial victories—that is, 200 aerial combat encounters resulting in the destruction of the enemy aircraft. In about 830 combat missions, he claimed a total of 212 aerial victories, almost all of which were achieved on the Eastern Front.

List of aerial victories claimed
According to US historian David T. Zabecki, Graf was credited with 212 aerial victories.  He claimed these aerial victories in 830 combat missions, 10 on the Western Front which included six four-engined-bombers and one Mosquito, and 202 on the Eastern Front.

Victory claims were logged to a map-reference (PQ = Planquadrat), for example "PQ 85 423". These sectors were then subdivided into 36 smaller units to give a location area 3 × 4 km in size.

Notes

References

Citations

Bibliography

 
 
 
 
 
 
 
 
 
 
 
 
 
 

Aerial victories of Barkhorn, Gerhard
Graf, Hermann
Aviation in World War II